"The Star of the Backstage" is the thirty-third season premiere of the American animated television series The Simpsons, and the 707th episode overall. It aired in the United States on Fox on September 26, 2021. The episode was directed by Rob Oliver, and written by Elisabeth Kiernan Averick.

The episode was originally named "No Day but Yesterday".

Plot
At the memorial of a recently-deceased theater director, Marge is given her old production manual from the widow about her high school play "Y2K: The Millennium Bug". Now filled with thoughtful memories of being the stage manager, Marge is encouraged to reunite her old classmates to restage the play.

At the theater, the group realizes that they are missing one of the cast members, Sasha Reed, who apparently has gone to New York after graduation and was accepted into Juilliard. Sasha arrives from above, and sings of how she has become a success during adulthood and having met various celebrities. Marge then realizes that, due to being unseen by the audience in the backstage, Sasha was the real star of the show.

Now desperate to take over the spotlight of the play (and even being further frustrated by the gang's recollection of high school memories that she wasn't part of), Marge finds out that Sasha is an impostor, having lied about having an amazing career, and had only became a saleswoman. Sasha breaks into tears and leaves the rehearsal, which affects the restaging of the play.

Homer convinces Marge in front of Bart and Lisa to bring Sasha back into the play, in a "delicate approach". Marge then realizes that Sasha's voice was one of the greatest elements of the play, and finds her at Moe's Tavern to apologize for letting jealousy and their old rivalry get in the way. Sasha agrees to join the play again, and with the rest of the gang, they perform once more. Bart and Lisa, meanwhile, end up shocked and dismayed that the play, both the original and restaged versions, ended abruptly.

During the credits, there are photos of the play's cast in different activities.

Reception

Viewing figures 
The episode was the highest-rated scripted program of the night (and the week), scoring a 1.2 demo rating and 3.48 million viewers. This is down from the previous season premiere, which aired with a substantially higher football lead-in, but the most-watched episode of the show since "A Springfield Summer Christmas for Christmas" in December 2020, which also had a football lead-in.

Critical response 
Tony Sokol of Den of Geek gave the episode 3.5 out of 5 stars, stating "All this being said, this is a great experiment which works enough to happen again. The musical numbers have been outshining much of the scripted gags in the past few seasons of The Simpsons, and this is an encouraging outgrowth of it. But, we need more than this. It feels like a retread of something they haven’t done before, when it should feel like a whole new experience. Maybe I expect too much, or am hoping that, at 33 seasons and counting, The Simpsons will recapture the magic Marge is looking for in this episode. 1999 was the last time we partied like it was 1999."

Marcus Gibson of Bubbleblabber gave the episode a 7 out of 10 stating, "Overall, the season 33 premiere of The Simpsons sang and danced its way to amusement rather than annoyance. It’s not a perfect way to start the season in terms of its humor and execution. However, as someone who enjoys watching musicals, it’s entertaining enough just to hear Marge sing like Princess Anna."

References

External links

2021 American television episodes
The Simpsons (season 33) episodes
Musical television episodes